Demirce is a village in the Daday District of Kastamonu Province, Turkey. Its population is 108 (2022). It is 53 km from Kastamonu city center and 28 km from Daday.

Population

References 

Villages in Daday District